Marsel İlhan (born 11 June 1987) is a Turkish professional tennis player, who was ranked No. 1 in Turkey and with a career-high singles ranking of world No. 77 in March 2015. He is the first ever Turkish player to reach the second round in a Grand Slam tournament, as well as the first Turkish player to win a Challenger Tournament and also the first to enter the top 100 in the world rankings (first ranked 96th in September 2010).

Early Tennis Career
Born in the Uzbek SSR in the Soviet Union (now Uzbekistan), he emigrated to Turkey with his mother in 2004 and he started to play for the Taçspor Tennis Club of İstanbul. He was initially sponsored by Kia Motors Turkey. After several years of intensive training with his new coach Can Üner, a former Turkish tennis player, he made an unprecedented jump within one year from No. 1320 to No. 320 in 2007.

2007–2008
During 2007 and 2008 he won several Future Tournaments and in July 2008, he won his first ATP Challenger title at Ramat Hasharon Israel Open by defeating Ivo Klec from Slovakia by 2 sets 6–4, 6–4.

2009
At the 2009 US Open, İlhan qualified for the main draw of a Grand Slam for the first time in his career. In doing so, he became the first Turkish player in the modern era to do so. In the first round, he defeated Christophe Rochus from Belgium in a five-set thriller. It was his first career ATP and Grand Slam win. He lost his second-round match against John Isner in straight sets.

İlhan, in October qualified for the 2009 PTT Thailand Open. He defeated his first-round opponent Benjamin Becker, but then lost to Jürgen Melzer.

2010
In the first qualification round of 2010 Australian Open he defeated Canadian Peter Polansky 6–1, 6–2. In the second qualification round he beat British No.2 Alex Bogdanovic with the same score 6–4, 6–4. In the 3rd qualification round Marsel lost 1–2 to German tennis player Dieter Kindlmann after a tough game in which he lost the first set 5–7, won the second easily 6–1 and lost the final set 9–11, in a game that lasted well over 3 hours.

However, due to Gilles Simon's injury a spot opened up for an additional player to appear on the main draw. Marsel became the "Lucky Loser" and progressed to the 1st round of Australian Open 2010. Marsel Ilhan proved that he was a worthy "Lucky loser" as he easily defeated former World No. 4 Sébastien Grosjean in 3 sets 6–4, 6–3, 7–5. In the second round Marsel lost to world No. 11 Chilean Fernando González in three sets: 3–6, 4–6, 5–7.

In the first round of Wimbledon 2010 he defeated Brazilian Marcos Daniel 3–2, where he made a superb comeback from 0–2 and eventually won the match. In the second round, he played against current World No. 37 player, Victor Hănescu and lost in four sets: 4–6, 4–6, 6–3 and 3–6.

On 20 September 2010 he won his second ATP Challenger Tournament, in Banja Luka, Bosnia and Herzegovina on clay by beating Pere Riba in the final 2–0, 6–0, 7–6. In the following Challenger Cup, the 2010 Türk Telecom İzmir Cup, he reached the final and despite losing, his ranking increased to a career-record 96th in the world - the highest ever for a Turkish tennis player.

2011
He got his highest ATP ranking position of No. 87 in January 2011. Therefore, he played directly in the main draw 2011 Australian Open for the first time during a Grand Slam tournament in his professional career. He lost in the first round to world No. 10 Russian Mikhail Youzhny in straight sets 6–2, 6–3, 7–6.

In the 2011 Indian Wells Masters, he lost against Milos Raonic from Canada in straight sets 6–2 and 7–6. Marsel participated in the second ATP Masters tournament the Miami Masters as a qualifier after negative results from the beginning of 2011. However, he reached the second round in Miami again, but in this round he lost to world No. 17 Serbian Viktor Troicki in 2 sets 6–3, 6–3.

In late May, he qualified as a lucky loser into his first French Open and progressed to the first round. Marsel defeated former World No. 2 Tommy Haas 6–4, 4–6, 7–6, 6–4 in the first round. However, after a gruelling 3h 58m battle with Guillermo Garcia-Lopez, he succumbed in five sets 4–6, 6–1, 2–6, 6–4, 11–13.

ATP Challenger and ITF Futures finals

Singles: 41 (23–18)

Doubles: 3 (1–2)

Performance timeline

Singles

References

External links
 Official website
 
 
 

Ethnic Tajik people
1987 births
Living people
Turkish male tennis players
Uzbekistani emigrants to Turkey
Turkish people of Uzbekistani descent
Naturalized citizens of Turkey
People from Samarkand
Mediterranean Games silver medalists for Turkey
Competitors at the 2009 Mediterranean Games
Competitors at the 2013 Mediterranean Games
Mediterranean Games medalists in tennis